Aspidosperma excelsum (common name Remo Caspi) is a tree in the Dogbane family Apocynaceae which grows up to one hundred feet (thirty meters) in height. It is native to Peru, Bolivia, Colombia, Venezuela, the Guianas, Panama, and Costa Rica.  Its most interesting characteristic is its trunk, which has a deeply sinuous cross-section, usually described as stellate, It is thought these sinuosities offer some protection against strangling figs (ficus spp) and other stranglers.

References

excelsum
Flora of South America
Flora of Central America
Plants described in 1841